List of Australia national rugby union players is a list of people who have played for the Australia national rugby union team. The list only includes players who have played in a Test match.

Note that the "position" column lists the position at which the player made his Test debut, not necessarily the position for which he is best known. A position in parentheses indicates that the player debuted as a substitute.

Australia's international rugby capped players

See also
Australia rugby union captains
List of international rugby union families

Notes

References

External links

 
Australia